Yuen Tuen New Village or Yuen Tuen New Village is a village in the Tsuen Wan District of Hong Kong.

Administration
Yuen Tuen New Village is a recognized village under the New Territories Small House Policy.

References

Villages in Tsuen Wan District, Hong Kong